Girolamo Compagnone (17 January 1620 – 1 November 1687) was a Roman Catholic prelate who served as Archbishop of Rossano (1685–1687).

Biography
Girolamo Compagnone was born in Aversa, Italy on 17 January 1620. On 5 February 1685, he was appointed during the papacy of Pope Innocent XI as Archbishop of Rossano. On 11 February 1685, he was consecrated bishop by Alessandro Crescenzi (cardinal), Cardinal-Priest of Santa Prisca, with Pier Antonio Capobianco, Bishop Emeritus of Lacedonia, and Giuseppe Felice Barlacci, Bishop of Narni, serving as co-consecrators. He served as Archbishop of Rossano until his death on 1 November 1687.

See also
Catholic Church in Italy

References

External links and additional sources
 (for Chronology of Bishops)
 (for Chronology of Bishops)

17th-century Italian Roman Catholic archbishops
Bishops appointed by Pope Innocent XI
1620 births
1687 deaths